The Razor's Edge is a 1946 American drama film based on W. Somerset Maugham's 1944 novel of the same name. It stars Tyrone Power, Gene Tierney, John Payne, Anne Baxter, Clifton Webb, and Herbert Marshall, with a supporting cast including Lucile Watson, Frank Latimore, and Elsa Lanchester. Marshall plays Somerset Maugham. The film was directed by Edmund Goulding.

The Razor's Edge tells the story of Larry Darrell, an American pilot traumatized by his experiences in World War I, who sets off in search of some transcendent meaning in his life. The story begins through the eyes of Larry's friends and acquaintances as they witness his personality change after the war. His rejection of conventional life and search for meaningful experience allows him to thrive while the more materialistic characters suffer reversals of fortune.

The Razor's Edge was nominated for four Academy Awards, including Best Motion Picture, with Anne Baxter winning Best Actress in a Supporting Role.

Plot

In the film Herbert Marshall appears as W. Somerset Maugham as the story's narrator and as an important character who drifts in and out of the lives of the other major players. The opening scene is set at a party held in the summer of 1919 at a Chicago country club. Elliott Templeton, an expatriate who has been living in France for years, has returned to the United States for the first time since before the war to visit his sister, Louisa Bradley, and his niece, Isabel. Isabel is engaged to be married to Larry Darrell, recently returned from service as a pilot during the Great War. Elliott strongly disapproves of Larry because he has no money and no interest in getting a job with a future so he can support Isabel properly. Among the party guests are Larry's childhood friend Sophie Nelson and her boyfriend, Bob MacDonald.

Larry refuses a job offer from the father of his friend Gray Maturin, a millionaire who is also hopelessly in love with Isabel. When Larry and Isabel talk about the future, she is filled with excitement about the future of the United States and the growth expected in the next ten years. He tells her that he wants to "loaf" on his small inheritance of $3,000 a year. Larry has been traumatized by the death of a comrade who sacrificed himself on the last day of the war to save Larry. He is driven to try to find out what meaning life has, if any. He can not do that in a stockbrokers’ office or a law firm. Larry and Isabel agree to postpone their marriage for a year so that he can go to Paris to try to clear his muddled thoughts.

Elliott has plans for Larry's entrée into elite Parisian society, none of which materialize. In Paris, Larry immerses himself in the life of a student, living in a modest neighborhood, eating and drinking in neighborhood bistros, sightseeing by biking through the countryside, reading voraciously, attending lectures at the Sorbonne. After a year, Isabel and her mother come to Paris and on their arrival are met by Elliott. Elliott is surprised that Larry is there to meet them as well and Isabel's mother explains to him that Isabel wired Larry about their impending arrival. Larry can see a little more clearly now, and asks Isabel to marry him immediately. She does not understand his desire to learn and more significantly, cannot bear the thought of possibly spending all their lives in what she sees as poverty. She breaks their engagement. The night before she returns to Chicago she sets out to seduce Larry, planning to write later and tell him that she is pregnant, thus tricking him into marriage. She can not go through with it. When Elliott, who has been waiting up for her, asks why she did not go through with it, she answers that it was her “better nature.” Elliott scoffs and says it was her “Middle-western horse sense”—she will forget him.

Cut to the reception after Isabel's marriage to Gray, which will provide her with the elite social and family life she craves. Sophie and Bob MacDonald are there. They have a baby, a little girl named Linda. Meanwhile, Larry works in a coal mine in France, where a drunk, debauched defrocked priest, Kosti, urges him travel to India to learn from a mystic. Larry studies at a monastery in the Himalayas under the tutelage of a Holy Man. Meanwhile, back in the States, the MacDonalds are in a car crash caused by a drunk driver. Bob and the baby are killed. In the hospital, the doctor asks Gray to tell Sophie, who is distraught and must be heavily sedated.

Time passes. In India, the Holy Man tells Larry that he has got all he can get from books, and it is time for him to make a lone pilgrimage to a mountaintop, where a shelter has been built against the rock. Some time later the Holy Man comes to visit. Larry describes his experience of enlightenment to the Holy Man, who understands that in that moment Larry felt that he and God were one. Larry wants to stay, but the Holy Man says that his place is with his own people. He must live in the world, but he will never lose this awareness of the infinite beauty of the world, which is the beauty of God.

Back in Paris, Maugham meets Elliott by chance and learns that Isabel and her family are living with Elliott after being financially ruined by the stock market crash of 1929. Gray has had a nervous breakdown and suffers from terrible headaches. Elliott "sold short" before the crash and "made a killing" in the market. Maugham arranges a lunch for Elliott and his household to meet an old friend, who turns out to be Larry. Isabel introduces Larry to her two daughters; the older is seven. It has been a long time since they last met. Larry is able to help Gray with his headaches using an Indian form of hypnotic suggestion.

Gray observes to Maugham that Larry has not aged since Chicago, and Maugham replies that India changed him: He “looks extraordinarily happy.... Calm, yet strangely aloof.” Later, while slumming at a disreputable bar in the Rue de Lappe, they encounter Sophie, now a drunkard and drug user, and her abusive pimp. Isabel is revolted, Gray horrified, and Larry friendly and calm. In the taxi, Larry, who did not know about the tragedy, asks what happened, and they tell him. Isabel says they had to “drop” Sophie eventually because of her bad behavior, and insists there was always something wrong with her, deep inside, or she would not have been so weak. Larry disagrees, recalling Sophie as an innocent young girl, and Isabel is plainly jealous. The Maturins join Elliott at the spa at Vittel for a few weeks. When they return, Isabel phones Larry at his hotel repeatedly. When she finally reaches him, he tells Isabel that he has seen a lot of Sophie and that she has stopped drinking and they are going to be married. The news drives Isabel wild and she summons Maugham; she wants him to intervene. He refuses. He reminds her of what Larry did for Gray, but she insists that Sophie is bad through and through and does not want to be helped. Maugham replies that drinking is not necessarily bad. He calls people bad who lie and cheat and are unkind. He tells her that Larry is in the grip of self-sacrifice and suggests that if she does not want to lose him altogether she should be nice to Sophie. So she asks Maugham to invite them all to lunch the next day, at the Ritz.

After lunch, they have coffee in the lobby. Sophie and Larry decline liqueurs, and Elliott bemoans the fact that his doctor forbids alcohol. The waiter convinces Elliott that a little Persovka can do no harm, and Elliott waxes poetic: Drinking it is “like listening to music by moonlight.” Isabel samples it, somewhat dramatically, and agrees, asking for some to be sent to the apartment. Maugham watches Sophie's reaction. Isabel wants to give Sophie a wedding dress that she saw in Molyneux's, and laughingly tells Larry he can not come to the fitting—no husbands allowed. Isabel and Sophie arrange to meet at the apartment the next afternoon.

Cut to the apartment, after the fitting. Isabel and Sophie have had non-alcoholic drinks. At last, they talk honestly—at least Sophie does. She has not had a drink since that night in the Rue de Lappe—clearly Larry went back for her immediately after he left the others. She admits what a struggle it is and says that she realizes that this is her last chance. She knew that Isabel was watching her at the Ritz. Isabel pours herself some Persovka and again praises it. She shows Sophie pictures of her children, which stirs memories of Linda. Then she asks Sophie to wait while she picks up her daughter from the dentist. They can talk more when she comes back. The butler removes the drinks tray; Isabel stares at the bottle of Persovka on the side table and then walks out. After a while, Sophie takes multiple drinks.

Larry scours the bars and dives, following the trail of a woman demanding Persovka until he tracks Sophie to an opium den. Sophie runs away, screaming, and disappears. Larry is beaten and thrown into the street; his last attempt to save his childhood companion from her depravity and despair has proved fruitless. A year later, Sophie is murdered in Toulon, and her death reunites Larry and Maugham during the police investigation.

Maugham and Larry visit Elliott on his deathbed in Nice. Maugham takes on the delicate task of asking Elliott if he is ready for the last rites. Elliott is in tears because he has not received an invitation for an important masked ball hosted by Princess Edna Novemali, princess-by-marriage, an American from Milwaukee whom Elliott helped when she first entered European society and who now treats him with contempt. Isabel and Gray arrive just as Larry leaves the house on a mission of mercy. Elliott tells Gray that he will now have enough money to pay off his father's debts and rebuild the business.

Larry persuades Miss Keith, the Princess's social secretary, to allow him to take a blank invitation to counterfeit one for Elliott and give him peace of mind. Elliott is hugely gratified when the Bishop himself comes to perform the last rites. Then an urgent message arrives—the invitation. Elliott's last act is to dictate a proper reply. He regrets he cannot attend “owing to a previous engagement with his Blessed Lord,” and adds, “The old witch.”

Immediately after Elliott's death, Isabel learns that Larry is leaving that night. He plans to work his way back to America aboard a tramp steamer. He tells her he may end up buying a taxi. She has already told Maugham that she plans on seeing as much of Larry as possible when she and Gray return to the States. Now she tells Larry that Gray needs him to help with the business, and as moral support. She reveals that Gray was suicidal at one point. Larry reassures her: Gray has got a second chance, as he himself had. He talks to her about his quest, but Isabel can only pour out her love and her regret that she did not marry him and stop him before he began it. She throws her arms around him and tells him she loves him and, she says, she knows he feels the same. She begs him to come home and be with her, then pulls back when he does not respond. Larry calmly says, “Tell me about Sophie,” and under his questioning Isabel first lies but then admits to tempting Sophie deliberately. She is full of self-righteous anger and justification, claiming that she did it to save Larry and as a test of Sophie's strength. Then Larry says, quietly, “That’s pretty much what I thought. Sophie is dead...murdered.” A stunned Isabel asks, “Do they know who did it?” Larry replies, “No, but I do.” The camera remains on Larry, so we do not see Isabel's face and do not know if Larry's response registers with her at all. He immediately tells Isabel that there is no need to be shocked about Sophie, that all day he has had the feeling that Sophie is where she wanted to be, with her husband and child. Gently and with compassion in his voice and face, he says “Good-bye Isabel. Take good care of Gray. He needs you now more than ever.” He walks away, his footsteps echoing on the hallway's marble floor.

A reeling Isabel tells Maugham, “I’ve lost him for good. ... Do you suppose we’ll ever see him again?” Maugham replies that her America will be as remote from Larry's as the Gobi Desert. She still does not understand what Larry wants. Maugham tells her that Larry has found what most people want and never get. “I don’t think anyone can fail to be better and nobler, kinder for knowing him. You see my dear, goodness is after all the greatest force in the world, and he’s got it.” Isabel turns to look out the window at the Mediterranean. Cut to Larry on the deck of a storm-tossed ship, hoisting cargo in the rain.

Cast

Production history
20th Century Fox purchased the film rights from Maugham in March 1945 for $50,000 plus 20% of the film's net profits. The contract stipulated that Maugham would receive an additional $50,000 if the film did not start shooting by February 2, 1946. In August 1945, producer Darryl F. Zanuck had the second unit begin shooting in the mountains around Denver, Colorado, which were to portray the Himalayas in the film. The stars had not yet been cast; Larry Darrell was played by a stand-in and was filmed in extreme long shot. Zanuck wanted Tyrone Power to star and delayed casting until Power finished his service in the Marines in January 1946.

Zanuck originally hired George Cukor to direct, but creative differences led to Cukor's removal. Although Maugham wanted his friend (whom he had in mind when he created the character) Gene Tierney for Isabel, Zanuck chose Maureen O'Hara but told her not to tell anyone. As O'Hara recounted in her autobiography, she shared the secret with Linda Darnell, but Zanuck found out, fired O'Hara, and hired Tierney. Betty Grable and Judy Garland were originally considered for the role of Sophie before Baxter was cast. Maugham wrote an early draft of the screenplay but not one word of his version was used in the final script, and as a result Maugham declined Zanuck's request to write a sequel, and never worked in Hollywood again.

Awards and nominations

See also
 The Razor's Edge, a 1984 adaptation with Bill Murray, Theresa Russell, Catherine Hicks, Denholm Elliott, and James Keach

References

External links
 
 
 
 
 

1946 drama films
1946 films
20th Century Fox films
American drama films
American black-and-white films
1940s English-language films
Film noir
Films scored by Alfred Newman
Films based on British novels
Films based on works by W. Somerset Maugham
Films directed by Edmund Goulding
Films featuring a Best Supporting Actor Golden Globe winning performance
Films featuring a Best Supporting Actress Academy Award-winning performance
Films featuring a Best Supporting Actress Golden Globe-winning performance
Films shot in Colorado
Films produced by Darryl F. Zanuck
Films with screenplays by Lamar Trotti
1940s American films